Thornton is a small village in Pembrokeshire, Wales. It is located approximately 1 mile outside of Milford Haven belonging to the Tiers Cross community. It is mainly residential in nature.  Until recently it was contained within the parish of Steynton.  

Notable features of the village are Thornton Baptist Chapel, built in 1867, which housed a British School in its lower level,  and the prehistoric fort which is probably Iron Age.

References

Milford Haven
Villages in Pembrokeshire